The Del Golfo Station is a station on Line 1 of the Monterrey Metro. This station is located in the Colon Avenue in the northeast side of the Monterrey Centre. The station was opened on 25 April 1991 as part of the inaugural section of Line 1, going from San Bernabé to Exposición.

This station serves the northeast side of the city centre and the Treviño neighborhood (Colonia Treviño). This station is near the old "Del Golfo" railroad station (now The Railroad Museum and the State Culture House), it is accessible for people with disabilities.

This station is named after the old "Del Golfo" railroad station, and its logo represents the facade of that building.

References

Metrorrey stations
Railway stations opened in 1991
1991 establishments in Mexico